Blomesche Wildnis is a municipality in the district of Steinburg, in Schleswig-Holstein, Germany. It lies to the north and east of the town of Glückstadt.

References

Municipalities in Schleswig-Holstein
Steinburg